John H. Barnes was an architect in the U.S. He designed several Romanesque style buildings in the late 19th century that are listed on the National Register of Historic Places (NRHP).

Barnes graduated from the University of Illinois and began his career in Colorado. He studied under Nathan Ricker at the University. He was the brother of fellow architect G. Julian Barnes. Julian Barnes designed the John R. Oughton House at 101 W. South Street in Dwight, Illinois.

Work
Orlando Flats, 2330 Washington Street, Denver, Colorado. NRHP listed
Pontiac City Hall and Fire Station, Pontiac, Illinois. NRHP listed
Lemont Central Grade School, Lemont, Illinois. NRHP listed
Farragut School, Joliet, Illinois
Cutting Building (1897), at 19 W. Jefferson Street in Joliet, Illinois

References

19th-century architects
Year of birth missing (living people)
Living people